Egypt Mill is a Grade II* listed building and a former mill located in Nailsworth, a market town within the Stroud district of Gloucestershire, England. The oldest parts of the building date from the 14th century, but the majority dates from the 16th century. Haberdasher George Hudson bought the property in 1656. Two decades later, in 1675, Hudson and his partner Henry Willoughby leased the mill to clothier Richard Webb. The building remained in the hands of the Webb family until 1832, when it was sold to Playne & Smith. It is known as Egypt Mill because Nathan Webb was such a slavedriver that the mill workers nicknamed him Pharaoh, and said they might as well be slaves in Egypt. Peter Playne had previously been the tenant. Late in the 19th century it became a dyeworks and later was used for grinding corn and animal feed and was run by G.H. King & Sons. King restored the name "Egypt Mill", liking the idea of being "King of Egypt". Egypt Mill has been a restaurant, hotel and event venue since the 1980s.

References 

Grade II* listed buildings in Gloucestershire
Nailsworth
Watermills in Gloucestershire